Henry Durrant may refer to:

Henry William Durant (1902–1982), opinion pollster and market researcher
Henry Durant (bishop) (1871–1932), Bishop of Lahore
Henry Durrant, of the Durrant baronets

See also
Durrant (surname)